Mirkot (  मिरकोट ) is a village development committee in Gorkha District in the Gandaki Zone of northern-central Nepal. It lies on the western side of the headquarters of Gorkha. According to the National Population and Housing Census 2011, it had a population of 5261 (2407 male and 2854 female), and had 1388 households in the village. Its neighbourhood VDCs are Gaikhur, Dhuwakot, Khoplang, Chyangli, Palumtar, Chhoprak and Deurali. Such as Kotgadi, Lakang, Mahadev Temple are the most important places of Mirkot. The central part of Mirkot VDC is called Bagdanda, Where the main office of the VDC and Mirkot Higher Secondary School are located.

•Major villages: Bagdanda, Sanabesi, Sera, Dhaukhola, Supare, Ramche, Kusuntar, Panthini, Lakang, Britti, Moho Riya, Jhahare, Simalgaira, Lajikot, Dharapani, Jogi Dihi, Tari etc.

•Major Places of Attractions: Such as Kotgadi, Lakang Kalika, Mahadev Temple, Historical Pond of Lazikot are the most Important historical places of Mirkot.

•Ethnic Group: People are mainly from Brahmin, Chhetri, Gurung, Dalit, Magar, Lama, Tamang and other community.

Gallery

References

See also 

Populated places in Gorkha District

pl:Bhirkot (Gorkha)